Mukhor-Tala (Mukhar Tala) is a rural locality (a selo) in Zaigrayevsky District, Republic of Buryatia, Russia. The population was 222 as of 2010. There are 4 streets.

Geography 
Mukhor-Tala is located 49 km southeast of Zaigrayevo (the district's administrative centre) by road. Novoilyinsk is the nearest rural locality.

References 

Rural localities in Zaigrayevsky District